Halid Bešlić (born 20 November 1953) is a Bosnian folk singer and musician who has been performing professionally since 1979. Bešlić's singing career was one of the most successful in Yugoslavia, and continues today throughout the entire Balkan region.

Early life
Bešlić was born in the Knežina village near Sokolac, Bosnia and Herzegovina, while it was part of FPR Yugoslavia.

His father Mujo Bešlić, a military man, died on 1 April 2016 at the age of 83 in a Sarajevo hospital. Halid, who was on tour in the United States at the time, managed to arrive to the funeral held in a village by Olovo, where Mujo had lived since the start of the Bosnian War in 1992.

Career
After serving a mandatory stint in the Yugoslav National Army, Bešlić moved from Knežina to Sarajevo and began performing at local restaurants. After several years, his first musical releases were eight singles between 1979 and 1982, with his first studio album, entitled Sijedi starac (White Haired Old Man), being released in 1981.

By 1984, he started becoming more and more well known, with popular songs such as "Neću, neću dijamante" (I Don't Want, I Don't Want Diamonds) and "Budi budi uvijek srećna" (Always, Always Be a Happy Woman) being heard all over Yugoslavia.

Since then, Bešlić has recorded 17 albums and staged countless concerts.

Bešlić released eight albums during the 1980s, with hit songs including "Vraćam se majci u Bosnu" (I Am Returning to my Mother in Bosnia), "Sjećam se" (I Remember), "Hej, zoro, ne svani" (Hey, Morning, Don't Rise) and "Eh, kad bi ti" (If Only You Would).

He also had several hit songs in the 2000s and 2010s. The 2003 album Prvi poljubac featured the hit song of the same name. The song "Miljacka", named after the Bosnian river, was featured on his 2007 album Halid 08 and the songs "Štiklom o kamen" (High Heels on Stone) and "Kad zaigra srce od meraka" (When the Heart Dances with Joy) were featured on Romanija (2013). The album Trebević, named after the Bosnian mountain, was released in February 2020.

Personal life

Bešlić married his wife Sejda in November 1977.

In the 1990s, during the breakup of Yugoslavia, Bosnia went into war and Bešlić staged more than 500 humanitarian concerts across Europe for the victims in his home country.

Bešlić has earned many awards and much financial success from his singing. Among his business interests is a gas station and hotel in the outskirts of Sarajevo.

In 2015, Bešlić acquired Croatian citizenship.

2009 car wreck
On 10 March 2009, Bešlić left his gas station at around 4 in the morning, and ran his Škoda Superb off the road, due to icy conditions, and crashed. Bešlić who was not wearing his seat belt had had serious injuries to his face and right eye, initially being in a coma. All of Bosnia and Herzegovina showed concern after Halid's wreck, as they awaited any news regarding his condition. He would eventually make a full recovery. Attempts to save his eye were undertaken at hospitals in Bosnia, Turkey and Belgium however they were all ultimately unsuccessful. After his recovery, Halid slowly made his way back onto the music scene. Notably, he held a major concert in Zagreb at the end of October 2009.

He had earlier survived a car wreck in 1986 with the singer Suzana Mančić.

Discography
Singles
Grešnica (1979)
Sijedi starac (1980)
Mirela (1981)
Pjesma samo o njoj (1982)

Studio albums
Sijedi starac (1981)
Pjesma samo o njoj (1982)
Dijamanti... (1984)
Zbogom noći, zbogom zore (1985)
Otrov (1986)
Zajedno smo jači (1986)
Eh, kad bi ti rekla mi, volim te (1987)
Mostovi tuge (1988)
Opet sam se zaljubio (1990)
Ljiljani (1991)
Grade moj (1993)
Ne zovi me, ne traži me (1996)
Robinja (1998)
U ime ljubavi (2000)
Prvi poljubac (2003)
Halid 08 (2007)
Romanija (2013)
Trebević (2020)

As featured artist
Ne zna juče da je sad (Yesterday Does Not Know That It's Today, 2011) with Viki Miljković

Concerts
Hala "Pionir" Beograd (uživo) (1988)
Koncert Skenderija (2001)
Halid Bešlić i gosti: Zetra Live (2004)
Halid Bešlić i Crvena Jabuka: Melbourne, Australia (2012)

Filmography

References

External links

 Halid Beslic 15 Godina Estrade - 1 Nimfa Sound Album

1953 births
Living people
People from Sokolac
Naturalized citizens of Croatia
Bosniaks of Bosnia and Herzegovina
Bosniaks of Croatia
20th-century Bosnia and Herzegovina male singers
21st-century Bosnia and Herzegovina male singers
Yugoslav male singers
Bosnia and Herzegovina folk-pop singers
Sevdalinka
Hayat Production artists
Musicians with disabilities